Bylaugh   is a civil parish in Norfolk, England  north-east of East Dereham and  WNW of Norwich. For the purposes of local government it falls within the Upper Wensum Ward of Breckland District Council and the Elmham and Mattishall Division of Norfolk County Council. According to the 2001 census it had a population of 65. At the 2011 census the population remained less than 100 and was included in the civil parish of Sparham.

The villages name origin is uncertain, it possibly could mean, 'funeral-pyre enclosure', or with a first element bel, perhaps meaning 'wood/clearing/island' and not otherwise evidenced in Old English.

Topography
This smaller than average parish has three farms and is bounded to the south by the River Wensum.  The rest of its people have smallholdings, live in the distant row of three cottages or live in homes in the Bylaugh Hall grounds.  Its shape, due to the river bends immediately south, resembles a molar (tooth).  Approximately one sixth of Bylaugh is made up of its northern woodland, Bylaugh Wood, which adjoins Bawdeswell Heath, separated by the road between that village and Dereham, the nearest main town.  Elevations range from 47 m in the grounds of Bylaugh Hall at its centre, to 22 m above mean sea level in the southwest corner, just above Elsing mill.  Like much of north Norfolk, the parish has a significant minority of woodland, its other named (and largest) woods being the Elsing Lodge/Jubilee Plantation and Sparhamhole Plantation.

Buildings
Medieval Church
The small parish church of St Mary the Virgin lies across the road from the edge of Bylaugh Park, on the north bank of the River Wensum. The round tower, one of 124 in Norfolk, with its hexagonal belfry dates from the  early 14th century. Whilst the nave is perpendicular, the transept and chancel date only to the early 19th century. Inside are still very intact, ornate box pews.  It stands out among the area’s buildings being at Grade I architecturally, particularly for its rarity.

A plaque on the west side of the church states:
The chancel of this church rebuilt, the North and South transepts added. The tower buttress, windows, roof and battlements substantially rebuilt and repaired. And the interior of this church and chancel fitted up at the sole expense of Sir John Lombe Bart. – Patron

Bylaugh Hall
Bylaugh Hall, built of stone in 1851, and its estate are immediately above the church.  The house is currently under restoration after it was stripped of its lead and interior fittings, and abandoned in 1950. The hall was the headquarters of 100 Group Royal Air Force during World War II.  Its flat (parapet) roof has "obelisks and heraldic beasts".  Its gatepiers, farm-enclosing railings and gazebo are separately listed, as is a farmbuilding and clocktower.
Other listed buildings
Rustic farmbuildings at Park Farm are listed at Grade II*.

Bylaugh Old Hall remains as a farm in the village. It is a brick building dating from the 17th century.

A sewage treatment works in the south of the village treats primarily the effluent of Swanton Morley and Bawdeswell, preventing damage to the canoe-navigable River Wensum.

Demography
The 2011 census statistics for the parish are unavailable due to its small size.  It forms the western third or so of the E00134328 Output Area that had 315 inhabitants: of these, 314 lived in a whole house or bungalow and only one lived in a flat.  None lived in a caravan, other mobile or temporary structure.

Notes and references
Notes 
  
References

http://kepn.nottingham.ac.uk/map/place/Norfolk/Bylaugh

External links

St Mary's on the European Round Tower Churches Website

Villages in Norfolk
Civil parishes in Norfolk
Breckland District